Tower Airline may refer to:
 Tower Air, 1983-2000
 Tarhan Tower Airlines, also defunct